Francesco de Mura (21 April 1696 – 19 August 1782) was an Italian painter of the late-Baroque period, active mainly in Naples and Turin. His late work reflects the style of neoclassicism.

Life
Francesco de Mura, also referred to as Franceschiello, was a pupil of Francesco Solimena, then later with Domenico Viola, where he met his contemporary, Mattia Preti.

While still in his teens he painted frescoes (1715) in San Nicola alla Carità in Naples. He painted ten canvases of the Virtues and an Adoration of the Magi (1728) for the church of Santa Maria Donnaromita. His other works include frescoes of the Adoration of the Magi (1732) in the apsidal dome of the church of the Nunziatella. De Mura also painted portraits.

Among his pupils were Pietro Bardellino, Giacinto Diano, Fedele Fischetti, Oronzo Tiso, Nicola Menzele and  Girolamo Starace.

Selected works

Dated
 Saint Benedict Welcomes Totila (vers 1710), study for the frescoes at the church of Santi Severino e Sossio, Capodimonte Museum, Naples
 Rest on the Flight into Egypt (1725-1735), Courtauld Institute of Art, London
 Epiphany (1728), Santa Maria Donnaromita, Naples
 Adoration of the Magi (1732), Nunziatella, Naples
 Self-portrait (1740), oil on canvas, Minneapolis Institute of Arts
 The Departure of Aeneas (c. 1740), huile sur toile, 102,5 x 129,5 cm, musée des beaux-arts de Brest, acquired 1969
 Madonna and Child with the Infant Saint John the Baptist (1750), Minneapolis Institute of Arts
 The Visitation (c. 1750), Cornell Fine Arts Museum, Florida
 Horatius Killing his Sister after the Defeat of the Curiatii (c. 1760), oil on canvas, private collection
 The Continence of Scipio (1765), Palazzo Leoni Montanari, Vicenza
 L'Accord entre Camille et Turnus (1765), Palazzo Leoni Montanari, Vicenza
Christ at the Column (1750–1760).
St. John the Baptist (1760–1770).
Assumption of the Virgin (drawing).

Undated
 Saint Vincent de Paul in Glory, Lazarist Church, Naples
 Assumption of the Virgin, Musée des beaux-arts de l'Ontario, Toronto
 Saint Ignatius de Loyola, Nunziatella, Naples
 Saint François Xavier Preaching to the Natives, Nunziatella, Naples
 Assumption of the Virgin, ceiling of the Nunziatella, Naples
 Portrait of count James Joseph O'Mahoney, lieutenant-general in the service of Naples, knight of Saint Januarius (c. 1748), Fitzwilliam Museum, Cambridge
 The Virgin Mary Presenting a Portrait of Saint Dominic to the Monks of Soriano, Art Institute of Chicago
 The Virgin Mary Indicating the Monogram of Christ to Saint Ludovico di Gonzaga (c. 1750), Gesù Vecchio, Naples 
 Allegory of the Arts, musée du Louvre, Paris
 Aurora and Tithon, oil on canvas, Capodimonte Museum, Naples
 The Wedding at Cana, Hôtel d'Agar collection, Cavaillon
 The Flight into Egypt, Hôtel d'Agar collection, Cavaillon

School of de Mura
 Portrait of Maria Xavieri Romano, Bowes Museum, County Durham, United Kingdom

References

Grove Art Encyclopedia abstract.
Short biography.
 Aurora and Tithonus, prince of Troy.
Allegory of Malta.

External links

1696 births
1782 deaths
17th-century Neapolitan people
18th-century Italian painters
Italian male painters
Painters from Naples
Italian Baroque painters
18th-century Neapolitan people
18th-century Italian male artists